The Raymond Horton-Smith Prize is a prize awarded by the School of Clinical Medicine, University of Cambridge for the best thesis presented for MD degree during the academical year. Known as the prize for the best MD of the year, it should be awarded annually but from time to time it has not been awarded for some years.
Often the prize has been considered to have a high prestige value since it has encouraged the Doctor of Medicine graduates (MD) of the world-renowned university to write the best thesis among them.

Founder
Richard Horton Horton-Smith, MA, KC (4 December 1831 – 2 November 1919) was a barrister and a Masonic Lodge Officer. Before to be a student and later a Fellow at St John's College, Cambridge, he attended also the University College School and the University College in London. His studies was about classics and law, becoming Classical Lecturer at King's College London. At the Lincoln's Inn, London, he was called to the Bar in 1859, becoming Queen's Counsel (QC) in 1877, Bencher in 1881, Trustee in 1884, Governor of Tancred's Charities in 1889, and Treasurer in 1903. He was member and officer of many Masonic Lodges (the Scientific Lodge, Cambridge, was his first one in 1856), becoming Life Governor of the Royal Masonic Benevolent Institution, and also founding a lodge in 1893 (the Chancery Bar Lodge). He obtained his highest rank of Past Grand Registrar of England in 1898.

He was author of many books and articles (with John Peter De Gex he wrote the book Arrangements between Debtors and Creditors under the Bankruptcy Act, 1861) and was also Honorable Counsel to the Royal Philharmonic Society, Director of the Royal Academy of Music, and vice-president of the Bar Musical Society.

He had three sons and two daughters. His third son Raymond John Horton-Smith (16 March 1873 – 8 Oct 1899), who studied medicine at several universities including the St John's College, Cambridge, gaining MB BCh, MA, MRCS, LRCP and achieving brilliant results (Wainwright Prizeman at University of London), died of tuberculosis at Davos, Switzerland, aged 27. Some months later, in 1900, Richard Horton-Smith found the Raymond Horton-Smith Prize in his honour, communicating to the Council of the Senate (University of Cambridge) his offer of a fund of 500 pounds for his proposed prize, which was approved on 16 March 1900. Later, moneys for the Raymond Horton-Smith Fund would be given also by his son Sir Percival Horton-Smith Hartley, and by his granddaughter Mrs. A. G. Wornum.

Eligibility and criteria
The candidates for the degree of Doctor of Medicine (MD) present their MD Thesis or a dissertation for the MD of the academical year at the University of Cambridge. A committee judges the best thesis or dissertation among the candidates, possibly consulting one independent referee, possibly paying him through a fee approved by the Cambridge University Council.

Award value
The value of the Prize is the net annual income of the Raymond Horton-Smith Fund deducting a possible fee (to pay a referee) and the price to purchase a book selected with the prize-winner but approved by the Vice-Chancellor and to be stamped with the arms of the university and with the Horton-Smith armorial bearings.

List of recipients
The main source is a column in the British Medical Journal titled "Universities and Colleges". To be concise the references include only the PMC ID of the pages where the column appears. Due to the lack of information available in internet the list is incomplete.

References

Awards and prizes of the University of Cambridge
Awards established in 1901
Medicine awards